Ski jumping at the 2015 Winter Universiade was held in Osrblie from January 27 to February 1, 2015.

Men's events

Women's events

Mixed events

Medal table

External links
Ski jumping results at the 2015 Winter Universiade.
Results book

 
Ski jumping
2015
Universiade
2015 in ski jumping